Hug is the second studio album by Japanese recording artist Yui Aragaki. It was released on June 17, 2009.

Background 
The album includes Aragaki's previously released singles "Make My Day ", "", "Piece" and "". It was released in three formats: CD+DVD standard edition, limited edition A, which has an illustration cover drawn by Aragaki herself and comes priced at 2,000 yen, and limited edition B, which comes with a bonus CD that includes acoustic renditions of the album tracks. The standard edition DVD includes four music videos as well as making footage of the album.

Chart performance 
Hug debuted on the daily Oricon Albums Chart at #3 with 5,897 copies sold. It peaked at #5 on the weekly charts with 22,540 copies sold, making it Aragaki's second consecutive album to debut in the top 5. The album peaked at #30 on the monthly albums chart and was the 216th best-selling album of 2009.

Track listing

Charts and sales

Release history

References

External links 

2009 albums
Yui Aragaki albums
Warner Music Japan albums